The Rotinoff Super Atlantic is a 6×4 ballast tractor made by the British company Rotinoff Motors Ltd. The Swiss Army bought ten of them (in Atlantic and Super Atlantic configuration) in 1958, which they used to pull trailers built by Scheuerle with a payload capacity of 50 tons. These were used for transporting the tank Pz 55/57 Centurion tank, thus reaching the total weight of 104 tons.

The Rotinoff Super Atlantic features a fuel capacity of 580 litres in two tanks. In addition to the three places in the cabin there are also two standing outside for traffic control available.

One of these tractors is on display at the Schweizerisches Militärmuseum Full, another in the Swiss Army Historic Foundation in Burgdorf, Switzerland and one is preserved in Oxfordshire, England.

References

External links 

 Data on the Rotinoff Super Atlantic by militärfahrzeuge.ch 
 Schweizerisches Militärmuseum Full: Werksammlung Mowag GmbH Kreuzlingen 
 Stiftung HAM Swiss Army Historic Foundation

Tractors
Military vehicles of Switzerland